Owen Thomas Parkin (born 24 September 1972) is a retired English cricketer. He is a right-handed batsman and a right-arm medium-pace bowler. Born in Coventry, his first-class career began with Glamorgan in 1994, playing twice during the 1994 County Championship, and taking 5/28 on his Sunday League debut, after a season in which he had spent much of the time incapacitated with a back injury. For a few years, he was a regular member of the Glamorgan team in both 4-day and 1-day cricket, but towards the end of his career, he was regarded more as a specialist one-day bowler, and played an important role in Glamorgan's National League successes in the early 2000s. He retired from first-class cricket in 2003.

Before joining Glamorgan, he played in the 1991 Second XI championship with Hampshire and also for Dorset Minor Counties.

Following his retirement, Parkin went into education as a mathematics teacher. He taught at Milton Abbey School from 2008 to 2011, and at Canford School from 2011 onwards. He has been a housemaster at both establishments.

References

External links
Owen Parkin at Cricinfo.com

1972 births
Living people
English people of Welsh descent
English cricketers
Glamorgan cricketers
Hampshire cricketers
Cricketers from Coventry
Dorset cricketers
Alumni of the University of Bath